Darrian Beavers (born July 5, 1999) is an American football linebacker for the New York Giants of the National Football League (NFL). He played college football at UConn before transferring to Cincinnati.

High school career
Beavers attended Colerain High School in Cincinnati, Ohio. He played wide receiver and safety in high school. He committed to the University of Connecticut to play college football.

College career
Beavers played two years at Connecticut before transferring to the University of Cincinnati. In those two years he started six of 24 games, recording 38 tackles and seven sacks. He transferred to Cincinnati in 2019. In his first year at Cincinnati, Beavers started 10 of 14 games and had 36 tackles. In 2020, he started 10 games, recording 58 tackles, 2.5 sacks and two interceptions. He returned to Cincinnati as a starter in 2021. He was a finalist for the Dick Butkus Award.

Professional career

Beavers was drafted by the New York Giants with the 182nd pick in the sixth round of the 2022 NFL Draft. Beavers tore his ACL in week 2 of the preseason against the Cincinnati Bengals and was placed on injured reserve.

References

External links
 New York Giants bio
Connecticut Huskies bio
Cincinnati Bearcats bio

1999 births
Living people
Players of American football from Cincinnati
American football linebackers
UConn Huskies football players
Cincinnati Bearcats football players
New York Giants players